The 1974 NCAA Division I Golf Championship was the 36th annual NCAA-sanctioned golf tournament to determine the individual and team national champions of men's collegiate golf at the University Division level in the United States.

The tournament was held at the Carlton Oaks Country Club in Santee, California, a suburb of San Diego.

Wake Forest won the team championship, the Demon Deacons' first NCAA title.

Curtis Strange, also from Wake Forest, won the individual title.

Wake Forest staged the largest comeback in NCAA Championship history and Curtis Strange won the title with one of the greatest shots in championship golf history.  The Demon Deacons erased a 33-shot deficit after the second round to go into the final round only three shots out of the lead.  On the 72nd and final hole, Strange teed off on a par-5 with Wake Forest tied for the team lead. On his second shot, he hit a one-iron to within three feet and rolled in the putt for a championship-clinching eagle.

Individual results

Individual champion
 Curtis Strange, Wake Forest

Team results

DC = Defending champions
Debut appearance

References

NCAA Men's Golf Championship
Golf in California
NCAA Golf Championship
NCAA Golf Championship
NCAA Golf Championship